Oktyabrskaya (. English: October [station]) is a Moscow Metro station in the Yakimanka District, Central Administrative Okrug, Moscow. Oktyabrskaya opened on 13 October 1962 and was originally the northern terminus of the Kaluzhskaya line before the latter extended northwards in 1970.

Design
The architects were A. Strelkov, Nina Aleshina, Yu. Vdovin. Oktyabrskaya has block white marble pylons and walls faced with white ceramic tile.

The station's freestanding entrance vestibule is located on Big Yakimanka street about half a block north of Kaluzhskaya Square (in 1962 - October square, hence the name), nearby the Garden ring.

Transfers
From this station it is possible to transfer to Oktyabrskaya on the Koltsevaya line.

Moscow Metro stations
Railway stations in Russia opened in 1962
Kaluzhsko-Rizhskaya Line
Railway stations located underground in Russia